Sarooj is a traditional water-resistant mortar used in Iranian architecture, used in the construction of bridges, and yakhchal.
It is made of clay and limestone mixed in a six-to-four ratio to make a stiff mix, and kneaded for three days . A portion of furnace slags from baths is combined with cattail (Typha) fibers, egg, and straw, and fixed, then beaten with a wooden stick for even mixing. Egg whites can be used as a water reducer as needed.

History
Mosaddad et al report the use of a mixture consisting of lime, sand and ash in the construction of an 1800 year-old Sasanian bridge-dam on the Karoon river south of Shooshtar. The Sheikh's biogas bath-house in Isphahan featured a water-impermeable sarooj composed of lime, egg white, and bamboo dust.

Another alternative formulation used for yakchal and water tanks in Iran uses "sand, clay, egg whites, lime, goat hair, and ash in specific proportions." All of these examples utilize pozzolanic properties and/or incorporate biopolymerization to increase the durability and impermeability of the plaster.

See also
Qadad, another preindustrial waterproof plaster
Tadelakt, another waterproof lime soap plaster

References

External links
Water Damage Restoration

Concrete
Plastering
Building materials
Architecture in Iran
Moisture protection